Bouncers is a video game developed by Dynamix and published by Electronic Arts for the Sega CD in 1994.

Gameplay
Bouncers is a combination fighting game and basketball game, with the player as the ball.

Reception
Next Generation reviewed the game, rating it three stars out of five, and stated that "It's goofy as hell, and a complete blast. However, it's such an odd concept for a game that it seems you either love it or hate it. Fortunately, we liked it."

Reviews
GamePro (Jan, 1995)
Electronic Gaming Monthly (Dec, 1994)
Game Players - Mar, 1995
Video Games & Computer Entertainment - Feb, 1995

References

1994 video games
Basketball video games
Dynamix games
Electronic Arts games
Multiplayer and single-player video games
Sega CD games
Sega CD-only games
Video games developed in the United States